Danielsen is a Nordic surname, originally meaning son of Daniel. Notable people with the surname include:

Åge Danielsen (born 1942), Norwegian civil servant
Anders Danielsen Lie (born 1979), Norwegian actor, musician and medical doctor
André Danielsen (born 1985), Norwegian professional footballer
Atli Danielsen (born 1983), Faroese footballer
Dag Danielsen (born 1955), Norwegian politician
Egil Danielsen (born 1933), former Norwegian javelin thrower
Erling Danielsen (1922–2010), Norwegian politician for the Christian Democratic Party
Harry Danielsen (1936–2011), Norwegian educator and politician for the Conservative Party
Henrik Danielsen (born 1966), Danish-Icelandic chess grandmaster
Jan Werner Danielsen (1976–2006), Norwegian pop, classical, and rock singer
Joen Danielsen (1843–1926), traditional Faroese poet writing in the Faroese language
John Danielsen (born 1939), Danish footballer
Kristin Danielsen, Norwegian orienteering competitor
Reidar Danielsen (1916–2000), Norwegian civil servant
Rolf Danielsen (1922–2002), Norwegian historian
Sean Danielsen American guitarist and vocalist for Smile Empty Soul and World Fire Brigade
Steffan Danielsen (1922–1976), Faroese painter
Victor Danielsen (1894–1961), the first Faroese Bible translator and Plymouth Brethren missionary
Vince Danielsen (born 1971), former professional Canadian football receiver
William Danielsen (1915–1989), Norwegian footballer

Other
MV Karen Danielsen, multipurpose container feeder, built in March 1985 by J.J. Sietas KG

See also 
Danielsan (disambiguation)
Danielson (disambiguation)
Danielsson (disambiguation)
Denílson (disambiguation)
Donelson (disambiguation)

Patronymic surnames
Danish-language surnames
Norwegian-language surnames
Surnames from given names